is a Japanese FM station that is based in Akita, Japan.

References

External links

Location map

Radio stations in Japan
Radio stations established in 1998
Mass media in Akita (city)